Sally Sedgwick is an American philosopher. She is a professor of philosophy at Boston University, and was previously the LAS Distinguished Professor at the Department of Philosophy, University of Illinois at Chicago (UIC).

Education and career
Sedgwick earned her BA in Philosophy from University of California, Santa Cruz and her Ph.D. in 1985, in philosophy from University of Chicago under the direction of Manley Thompson.  She taught philosophy at Dartmouth College from 1985 until 2003, when she moved to the University of Illinois, Chicago.  In January 2019, she joined the department at Boston University.

Philosophical work
Sedgwick is best known for her work on Kant, Hegel, and especially the relation between the two philosophers. The result of her analysis of this relation was published in a very well-received monograph, Hegel's Critique of Kant: From Dichotomy to Identity. Sedgwick argues that Hegel criticized Kant for his ambitions to give an account of human cognition in terms of necessary and non-historical categories. She is now working on the details of Hegel's philosophy of history and its relation to his theory of knowledge and ethics.

Sedgwick has been awarded various grants by the NEH, ACLS, DAAD, Fulbright, and the Alexander von Humboldt Foundation. She has been a visiting professor at University of Pennsylvania, Harvard University, University of Bonn, University of Bern,  and Universität Luzern. In 2009, Sedgwick was appointed the president of the Central Division of the American Philosophical Association.

Bibliography
Hegel's Critique of Kant: From Dichotomy to Identity (Oxford University Press, 2012).
Kant's Groundwork of the Metaphysics of Morals: An Introduction (Cambridge University Press, 2008).
McDowell's Hegelianism (European Journal of Philosophy, 1997).

References

External links
An interview with Sally Sedgwick
Profile on Sedgwick in Tableau

American philosophers
Hegelian philosophers
University of Chicago alumni
University of California, Santa Cruz alumni
People from Chicago
University of Illinois Chicago faculty
Living people
Year of birth missing (living people)
American women philosophers
Presidents of the American Philosophical Association